Zagorye is a rural locality (a village) in Nizhneyerogodskoye Rural Settlement, Velikoustyugsky District, Vologda Oblast, Russia. The population was 38 as of 2002.

Geography 
The distance to Veliky Ustyug is 38.8 km, to Lodeyka is 3.2 km. Malaya Gorka is the nearest rural locality.

References 

Rural localities in Velikoustyugsky District